Varvarco is a village and municipality in Neuquén Province in southwestern Argentina.

History
During the final stages of the independence wars Varvarco, located in indigenous territory, became the main base of the Pincheira brothers, a royalist outlaw gang. More than a hideout the operations of the Pincheiras and their indigenous allies effectively turning Varvarco into a large town with 2000 Chilean women and 40,000 heads of cattle grazing in the nearby countryside.

References

Populated places in Neuquén Province